Statistics of Emperor's Cup in the 1940 season.

Overview
It was contested by 8 teams, and Keio BRB won the championship.

Results

Quarterfinals
Kansai University 1–2 Imperial University of Kyoto
Yonhi College 1–2 Waseda University WMW
Kwansei Gakuin University 1–1 (lottery) Bosung College
Imperial University of Tohoku 0–3 Keio BRB

Semifinals
Imperial University of Kyoto 1–2 Waseda University WMW
Bosung College 1–2 Keio BRB

Final

Waseda University WMW 0–1 Keio BRB
Keio BRB won the championship.

References
 NHK

Emperor's Cup
1940 in Japanese football